Voisine v. United States, 579 U.S. 686 (2016), was a United States Supreme Court case in which the Court held that the Domestic Violence Offender Gun Ban in U.S. federal law extends to those convicted of reckless domestic violence. The court reached its judgment in a 6–2 majority.

Background 
In 2009, an anonymous caller in Maine notified officials that a bald eagle had been shot in Kingman. Investigating officers discovered the primary suspect, Stephen L. Voisine, was not legally permitted to possess a firearm. His prior domestic violence conviction barred him from possessing a gun, resulting from the Lautenberg Amendment signed into law in 1996. During Voisine's interrogation, he admitted to shooting the eagle.  Subsequently, officials discovered his 28-year criminal record included 14 convictions for assault and domestic violence.

Voisine joined William Armstrong III to argue that their domestic violence convictions should not have precluded them from owning guns in the first place. They requested the Supreme Court to consider whether the Lautenberg Amendment was constitutional in the light of the precedent of District of Columbia v. Heller that the Second Amendment protected an individual right to bear arms. However, the court refused to consider this question, limiting itself to the question of whether the defendants' convictions for reckless acts of violence (as opposed to intentional ones) fell within the meaning of the Lautenberg Amendment.

During the oral arguments of the case, Justice Clarence Thomas asked a question from the bench for the first time in 10 years.

Opinion of the Court 
Associate Justice Elena Kagan authored the 6-2 majority opinion. Justices Clarence Thomas and Sonia Sotomayor were the dissenters. The court held that Mens rea of recklessness was sufficient because the Lautenberg Amendment does not mention intentionality. The court used an analogy of a thrown plate to illustrate the meaning of recklessness in an abuse context. The dissent disagreed with the majority holding that the term "reckless" is too broad under the Maine statute to pass constitutional muster for prohibition of firearms.

References

External links
 
 SCOTUSblog coverage

United States Supreme Court cases
United States Second Amendment case law
United States Supreme Court cases of the Roberts Court
2016 in United States case law
Domestic violence in the United States
Legal history of Maine
United States federal firearms case law